Ipecac Recordings is an American independent record label founded in 1999 by Greg Werckman  and Mike Patton. The label was established to release Patton's band Fantômas' self-titled début, allowing retention of "all the creative control". Its creation also provided the Melvins – friends of Werckman and Patton's – with a label.

Ipecac has distributed material by other artists, including Isis, Dälek, and many of Patton's other projects and collaborations. Though the label's main output is rock and experimental music, it has also released DVDs, a book, soundtracks and a work of comedy. Alongside original content, it has been responsible for re-releasing older and imported recordings originally handled by other labels, as well as vinyl releases of later albums by Queens of the Stone Age.

Key

List of releases

References

General

Specific

External links
Ipecac Recordings at Discogs

Discographies of American record labels